Morupule is a small town in Botswana.

Infrastructure 

It is severed by a station on the national railway network.

It also has an airport, coal mine, and power station.

See also 

 Railway stations in Botswana

References 

Populated places in Botswana